Yellow fever is an acute viral hemorrhagic disease.

Yellow fever may also refer to:
 Yellow Fever (album), a 1975 blues-rock album by Hot Tuna
 Yellow Fever!, a 2006 Latin-electronica album by Señor Coconut (Uwe Schmidt)
 Yellow Fever (play), a 1982 play by R. A. Shiomi
 "Yellow Fever" (Supernatural), an episode of the television series Supernatural
 The Yellow Fever, a fan club for New Zealand football team Wellington Phoenix FC
 "Yellow Fever", a song by Bloodhound Gang from their 1996 album One Fierce Beer Coaster
 "Yellow Fever", a song by Fela Kuti
 The slang term for the sexual fetishization of East Asian people; see Asian fetish